Âu Văn Hoàn (born 1 October 1989 in Nghệ An) is a Vietnamese footballer who plays as a right back for Haiphong, formerly playing for other teams including SHB Đà Nẵng, TP Hồ Chí Minh and the Vietnam national team. Văn Hoàn is part of Vietnam's Christian minority.

Honours

Club
Sông Lam Nghệ An
 V.League 1:
 Winners : 2011
Becamex Bình Dương
 V.League 1:
 Winners : 2014, 2015
 Vietnamese National Cup
 Winners : 2015
 Runners-up :2014
 Vietnamese Super Cup
 Winners : 2014, 2015
Mekong Club Championship
 Winners : 2014

International
Vietnam
AFF Championship
Semi-finalists : 2016
 AYA Bank Cup 
 Winners :: 2016

References 

1989 births
Living people
People from Nghệ An province
Vietnamese Roman Catholics
Vietnamese footballers
Association football fullbacks
V.League 1 players
Song Lam Nghe An FC players
Becamex Binh Duong FC players
SHB Da Nang FC players
Vietnam international footballers